Hegman Ngomirakiza (born 25 March 1992) is a Rwandan international footballer who plays for APR.

International career

International goals
Scores and results list Rwanda's goal tally first.

Honours 
APR
Winner
 Rwanda National Football League (5): 2009–10, 2010–11, 2011–12, 2013–14, 2014–15

References

External links 
 

1992 births
Living people
Rwandan footballers
Rwanda international footballers
APR F.C. players
Association football midfielders
People from Kalemie
Rwanda A' international footballers
2016 African Nations Championship players